Johnny Cash Sings the Ballads of the True West is a concept double album and the 22nd overall album released by country singer Johnny Cash, released on Columbia Records in 1965 (see 1965 in music). Covering twenty individual songs, the album, as its title suggests, contains various ballads and other songs on topics related to the history of the American Old West. This includes Carl Perkins' "The Ballad of Boot Hill", "Streets of Laredo", and the sole single from the album, "Mr. Garfield", describing the shock of the population after the assassination of President James Garfield. One of the songs, "25 Minutes to Go", would later be performed at Folsom Prison and appear on Cash's famous At Folsom Prison recording in 1968, while the melody of "Streets of Laredo" would be recycled for the song "The Walls of a Prison" featured on Cash's album From Sea to Shining Sea.

Sings the Ballads of the True West was re-issued in 2002 (see 2002 in music) through Legacy Recordings, with two bonus tracks, one of which is an instrumental version of a track available on the album. The original album was included on the Bear Family box set Come Along and Ride This Train.

Track listing

Personnel
 Johnny Cash - vocals, guitar
 Luther Perkins - guitar
 Norman Blake, Jack Clement - acoustic guitar
 Bob Johnson - 12-string guitar, flute, banjo, mandocello
 Marshall Grant - bass
 W.S. Holland - drums
 Michael N. Kazak - drums
 Bill Pursell - piano, harpsichord
 Charlie McCoy - harmonica
 Mother Maybelle Carter - autoharp
 The Carter Family, The Statler Brothers - background vocals

Modern Interpretations & associations
Baltimore based creative folklore/music ensemble Television Hill have recorded a 6-song concept EP called My Name's Hardin, the title of which pokes fun at Bob Dylan's misspelling of outlaw Wes Hardin's name on his 1967 release John Wesley Harding and paying homage to Dylan's record and Johnny Cash's double concept LP Sings the Ballads of the True West. The EP is a biographical work exploring Wes Hardin's life and draws from Hardin's autobiography, Letters from Prison and an assortment of other biographical and relevant source material.

Mean as Hell!
In March, 1966 (see 1966 in music), Columbia released Mean as Hell! : Ballads From The True West, a single LP distillation of Sings the Ballads of the True West.  It peaked at #4 on the top country albums chart.  It has not been released on CD.

Track listing

Charts
Album - Billboard (United States)

Singles - Billboard (United States)

References

External links
 Luma Electronic album information for Johnny Cash Sings the Ballads of the True West
 Luma Electronic album information for Mean as Hell

Johnny Cash albums
1965 albums
Columbia Records albums
Concept albums